Hampton Christian Academy (HCA) is a private pre-K to grade 12 Christian school located in Hampton, Virginia, United States. The school has an elementary school campus and a high school campus.

Extracurricular activities
Hampton Christian offers a wide range of sports, including baseball, cheerleading, volleyball, basketball, American football, soccer and tennis. Extracurricular activities include the Journalism Club, the Creative Writing & Literature Club, the Poetry Club and an honors society (Beta Club).

Notable students and alumni
 Jake Cave - baseball player
 Philip Jones - Mayor of Newport News (2023 - present)

References

External links
 Hampton Christian Schools
 Hampton Christian Academy

Christian schools in Virginia
Private K-12 schools in Virginia
Schools in Hampton, Virginia